Loretto is an unincorporated community in Rush County, Kansas, United States.

History
The community was founded in 1876, and named with the same name as the Illinois township where it was located.  Its name evolved over time from Illinois to Marienfeld to Loretto.

Education
The community is served by Otis–Bison USD 403 public school district.

References

Further reading

External links
 History of Cities in Rush County
 Rush County maps: Current, Historic, KDOT

Unincorporated communities in Rush County, Kansas
Unincorporated communities in Kansas